Sunday Report is a TVB News programme which first aired on Tuesday March 10, 1987. It airs Sunday at 7pm on TVB Jade.

References

TVB original programming